The Kumay is a river in Perm Krai, Russia, a left tributary of the Kolva, which in turn is a tributary of the Vishera.

References

Rivers of Perm Krai